Maná Remix is compilation album (Fourteenth overall) set by Latin American Mexican rock band Maná. This compilation album is an exclusive project that Maná did from Mexico.

Track listing
"Rayando El Sol"
"Cómo Te Deseo"
"La Chula"
"Selva Negra"
"Hechicera"
"Como Dueles En Los Labios"
"Clavado En Un Bar"
"En El Muelle De San Blás"
"Rayando El Sol (MTV Unplugged version)"
"Corazón Espinado"
"Corazón Espinado (Spanglish version)"
"Ángel de Amor"
"Eres Mi Religión"

Maná remix albums
2002 remix albums
Warner Music Latina remix albums
Spanish-language remix albums